The 1970–71 Midland Football League season was the 71st in the history of the Midland Football League, a football competition in England.

Clubs
The league featured 17 clubs which competed in the previous season, along with one new club:
Frickley Colliery, joined from the Cheshire County League

League table

References

External links

Midland Football League (1889)
M